Rugby League Challenge is a sport simulation game for the PlayStation Portable based on the National Rugby League and the Super League. The game was developed by Australian game developer Wicked Witch Software and was published by Tru Blu Entertainment. The game is based on the 2009 NRL season and Super League XIV. It features all 16 NRL teams and 14 Super League teams.

Gameplay
Rugby League Challenge allows players to play through the entire season, through to the Grand Final. It features a team management system where players can be trained up in skills such as kicking, tackling and running.

The game also features a quick match mode, as well as the season mode. Multiple camera angles are available to choose from both in the options menu and while playing the game. Camera angles range from close behind the player to wide zooms showing most of the stadium.

Marketing
As part of the marketing campaign for Rugby Challenge, Network Ten's programme, Thursday Night Live, promoted the game claiming it was the inspiration for an inter-league kicking competition. Asides from television, Sony's Australian PSP site is featuring a front page advertisement for this title.

See also

AFL Challenge
NRL Mascot Mania
Rugby League (video game series)

References

External links
Wicked Witch Software's website
Sony's Page for Rugby League Challenge

2009 video games
PlayStation Portable-only games
Rugby league video games
Australia-exclusive video games
Video games developed in Australia
Video games set in Australia
PlayStation Portable games
Sony Interactive Entertainment games
Multiplayer and single-player video games
Wicked Witch Software games
Tru Blu Entertainment games